Mohammad Imam Hossain (born January 5, 1984) is a Bangladeshi sport shooter. Hossain represented Bangladesh at the 2008 Summer Olympics in Beijing, where he competed for the men's 10 m air rifle. He placed forty-sixth out of fifty-one shooters in the qualifying rounds, with a score of 581 points.

References

External links
 
NBC Olympics Profile

Bangladeshi male sport shooters
Living people
Olympic shooters of Bangladesh
Shooters at the 2008 Summer Olympics
1984 births
Shooters at the 2006 Asian Games
Asian Games competitors for Bangladesh